Antoni Karwowski (born 14 April 1948) is a Polish lyrical abstraction painter and neofiguration painter and performance artist.

Early life and family
Karwowski was raised in a small town in Eastern Poland near Biebrza National Park. His father, Jozef Karwowski, was a social worker and promoter of culture and his mother Larysa (maiden name Zub) was a hairdresser.  He has one younger brother, Maciej.

Karwowski grew up in a multigenerational family under the strong influence of his father and Russian grandfather, Szymon Zub.  His father gave him his first drawing lesson, and his grandfather was also creative, writing poetry and singing old Russian songs.  His later work was influenced by Polish and Russian culture and traditions, as well as a childhood surrounded by the wilderness that encouraged his sensitivity and strong feelings of individualism.

Painting and performance art

After graduating high school Karwowski started painting more and experimenting with different forms of art. He changed homes and universities several times while looking for a place where he could fully develop his talents. He worked as a miner while conducting his search, and later joined the Fine Arts Faculty at the Nicolaus Copernicus University in Toruń, where he became a professional artist.

In early 80s Karwowski and Zbigniew Oleszynski started a Polish performance group known as "Group A". From that time on, Karwowski has been heavily engaged in performance art, both as an organizer and a participant. Since 2003 he has organized the International Performance & Intermedia Festival in Szczecin.

Throughout his career Karwowski has created his own style of which a Berlin art critic said, "From his images comes colorful light, which is created by perfection in his workshop. Metaphor of this light gives magical, surreal meaning to figurative elements in his paintings. The power of his paintings, aside from illuminating colors, comes from the richness of symbolic meanings and certain multilayer by which Karwowski ’s paintings are far from simple decorative function."

Karwowski's paintings focus on color and light. His paintings are housed in various private collections in Europe. He has also been commissioned by compound corporations and institutions, such as the Clinic in Dortmund (Germany) in 2005.   For the clinic, he created 53m long wall panels that have received attention from a wide audience.

Art Exhibitions: 
2010 - "Anders Gallery" -Lünen (Germany)
2007 – "Anders Gallery" - Lünen (Germany)
2007 - "ZERO Gallery"- Berlin (Germany)
2006 - Museum of Art - Santa Fe (Argentina)
2006 - Museum Contemporary Art – Naples (Italy)
2005 - "Galerie automatique" - Berlin-Strasbourg
2005 - Art Platform - Tel Aviv (Israel)
2005 - Polish Art Fair 2005 - Poznan (Poland)
2004 – Project "MOTION"- Berlin (Germany)
2003 - V International Baltic Biennial – Szczecin (Poland)
2002 - Berliner Landtag – Berlin (Germany)
2002 - "Distance 777", 68elf gallery – Köln (Germany)
2001 - Europäisches Kulturzentrum - Köln (Germany)
2001 – “Kunst am limit”, "Pussy Galore"- Berlin (Germany)
2001 - "RAUMTRIEB 2001", art festival – Berlin (Germany)
2001 – "Wystawa malarstwa, Reimus gallery - Essen (Germany)
1999 - Ostholstein Museum – Eutin (Germany)
1999 - Galerie am Domplatz – Münster (Germany)
1999 - National Museum in Szczecin - Szczecin  (Poland)
1996 – “Forum Ost – West” – Bergisch Gladbach (Germany)
1994 - "Anders Gallery" - Lünen (Germany) 
1994 - "Forum Gallery" – Leverkusen (Germany)
1993 – “Cztery Zywioly” – Museum Greifswald (Germany)
1992 - "Gaia Cztery Sezony"- Gerlesborg (Sweden)
1992 - Municipal Gallery - Nakskov (Denmark)
1990 - "En Garde Gallery" - Aarhus (Denmark)
1988 - "Fine Art Gallery" - Trollhattan (Sweden)
1988 - XV Festival of Polish Contemporary Art- Szczecin (Poland)
1987 - "Bridge West & East" - Antwerpen (Belgium)
1985 - "Nagra Malare" - Vanersborg (Sweden)
1981 – “Palacyk” - Wroclaw  (Poland)

Selected Performance projects:
2011 - La Porta 2011 - Barcelona (Spain)]
2010 - "My Tram" - Szczecin (Poland)
2010 - "Extension Series 2" - Grim Museum 2, Berlin (Germany) 
2005 - "Reading White Books " - Tel Aviv (Israel)
2001 - "Salz arm" - Berlin  (Germany)  
1998 - “Sentimental trip on east" - Moltkerei Werkstatt, Cologne (Germany)
1998 - "Middle ages anatomy" & "Gilgamesz – Enkind’s Dream” -  Ermelerspeicher Gallery, Schwedt, (Germany)
1993 - "The Last Breath of Aborigine” – Gerlesborg  (Sweden) 
1981 - "Koncert na Kaprala i grzalke" Teatr Otwarty "Kalambur" – Wroclaw  (Poland)
1980 – Public Space Action ”My Tram” – Torun (Poland)

Cultural Projects involvement:
2003 - 2009 Curator International Performance & Intermedia festival – Szczecin (Poland)
2002 - 2005 Co-organizer international performance project “Private impact”
1995 - 1999 Originator International Performance festival "Trawnik" (Poland – Germany)
1992 - 1994 Co-organizer international project "Gaia the four elements"
1981 - 1986 Organized and kept Centre of Art in Swinoujscie (Poland)
1980 - 1981 Cooperated as artist with Open Theatre Centre "Kalambur" in Wroclaw (Poland)

References

Mariusz Czarniecki, Czas przyszly dokonany, Spojrzenia, 12.1974.
Zwijndrechts echtpaar ijvert voor Oost-Europese kunst, De Zwijndrechtse Kombinatie, 04.02.1987.
Lillemor Svensson, Polska målare i Vänersborg, Trollhättans Tidning, 26.03.1988.
C.F.Garde, Kvindelighed på flere måder, Politiken, 25.02.1992.
Polska abstraktioner hos Några Målare, Ela, 11.02.1993.
Kulturen blomstrar på landet, Svenska Dagbladet, 26.02.1993.
Ingeborg Schwenke-Runkel, In die Wiesen längs der Oder, Kölner Stadt – Anzeiger, 05.03.1996.
Wolfgang Cassel, Vielfalt der polnischen Kunst, Lübecker Nachreichten, 22.06 1996.
Vier Künstler aus Stettin, Ostholsteiner Anzeiger, 28.06.1996.
Licht, Dunkelheit und flammende Energie, Hamburger Abendblatt, 12.04.1997.
Zwei Künstler aus Stetin, Altländer Tageblatt, 12.04.1997.
Karin M.Erdtmann, Mit Tauchsieder und Toilettenfrau- Neue Galerie zeigt Antoni Karwowski, Kölner Stadt-Anzeiger, 28.05.1997.
Im Tabakspeicher Kunst erleben, Schwedter Stadtanzeiger, 25.06.2000.
Marita Poschitzki, Ausstellung auch in Stettin geplant, Uckemärker, 03.05.2001.
Sprache der Natur, Kölner Stadt-Anzeiger, 19.04.2002
Performance polsko-niemiecki, Karwowski i Deimling, Głos Szczeciński, 13.06.2003

External links

 
 68Elf Gallery, Cologne
 Galerie Anders, Luenen
 Klinikum Dortmund
 ArtNews.org
 AND - Artist Network Database
 rhiz.eu

1948 births
Living people
Polish artists
Polish people of Russian descent
Nicolaus Copernicus University in Toruń alumni
Academic staff of Nicolaus Copernicus University in Toruń
People from Grajewo